Gaius Antonius (82–42 BC) was the second son of Marcus Antonius Creticus and Julia, and thus, younger brother of the Triumvir Mark Antony.

Life

Early life
Like both of his brothers, Gaius started his life free from paternal guidance, in the midst of scandals, parties and gambling.

Civil war
During Caesar's civil war, Gaius was a legate of Julius Caesar (49 BC) and was entrusted with the defense of Illyria against Pompeians and with the campaign to regain cities already taken by rebels and the Pompeians.  Gaius was entrusted with the newly recruited 24th legion and half of the new 28th legion. On the way to Illyria, Antonius was intercepted by a Pompeian fleet. Led by centurion Titus Pullo, the men refused to fight, and turned traitor. They were then reported to be fighting at the Battle of Dyrrachium.

Caesar's dictatorship
With all the members of the Antonius family, he was then promoted to high offices of the cursus honorum. In 44 BC, Gaius was urban praetor, while his brothers Mark Antony and Lucius Antonius were consul and tribune, respectively.

Caesar's assassination and afterwards
After the assassination of Caesar, Gaius (as a Caesarean) was appointed governor to the Roman province of Macedonia. Marcus Junius Brutus and the other assassins, however, chose Macedonia as refuge from Octavian and - following opposition from Gaius - dispossessed him of his governorship.  Brutus at first seemed to treat him generously, but, on finding that he was attempting to persuade his troops to mutiny and with the recent murder of Cicero ordered by his brother, Brutus ultimately ordered his death.

References

Sources
 Plutarch, Brutus, 28
 Dio Cassius xlvii. 21-24
 
 

42 BC deaths
Ancient Roman generals
Gaius
1st-century BC Romans
Year of birth unknown
Executed ancient Roman people
People executed by the Roman Republic
Family of Mark Antony